William Ronald Collins (29 January 1868 – 10 December 1942) was an English cricketer. Collins was a right-handed batsman who bowled right-arm fast. He was born at Hackney, Middlesex and was educated at Wellington College.

Collins made a single first-class appearance for Middlesex in the 1892 County Championship against Somerset at the County Ground, Taunton. He was dismissed twice in the match for ducks, firstly by Coote Hedley in Middlesex's first-innings and then by George Nichols in their second.

He died at Thrapston, Northamptonshire on 10 December 1942.

References

External links
William Collins at ESPNcricinfo
William Collins at CricketArchive

1868 births
1942 deaths
People from Blaby
Cricketers from Leicestershire
People educated at Wellington College, Berkshire
English cricketers
Middlesex cricketers
People from Hackney Central